Paul Frederic Bennewitz, Jr. (September 29, 1927 – June 23, 2003) was an American businessman and UFO investigator.  According to the multiple sources,  Bennewitz was the target of a government disinformation campaign that ultimately led to his psychiatric hospitalization.

Career
Bennewitz was the son of Stella A. Sharp and Paul Frederic Bennewitz, Sr. (1900–1949).

Bennewitz was a native of Kansas.  
Bennewitz earned a Bachelor's degree from Arizona State, but had no formal training in electronics. 

During World War 2, Bennewitz was a radio electronics engineer for the Coast Guard.  He worked as a engineer for San Francisco CBS station KPIX, and KPHO in Tuscon.   

On February 25, 1949,  Bennewitz married Cindy Bunch in Phoenix, Arizona.

Around 1953, Bennewitz moved to New Mexico and started working for Gulton Industries, doing sales;  Bennewitz later began his own industrial sales company.  
In 1966, Bennewitz acquired the rights to a humidity sensor from Sandia National Laboratories.  He founded Thunder Scientific, a small family business, with wife Cindy serving as bookkeeper.

In April 1981, Bennewitz was profiled in the Albuquerque Tribune about his company, Thunder Scientific.   The paper reported that Thunder did about $1 million in sales, but profits had waned over recent years;  In 1978, Thunder employed 30 people, but by 1981, that number had dropped to only 18 employees.

UFO conspiracy theories

During the 1970s, Bennewitz became a member of Arizona's Aerial Phenomena Research Organization (APRO), a civilian UFO investigation group.  By the mid-1970s,  cattle mutilations had become associated with UFOs.   On April 20, 1979,  U.S. Attorney R. E. Thompson and US Senator Harrison Schmidt held a public meeting about cattle mutilations.  The meeting was attended by about 80 -- one attendee was Paul Bennewitz.  

Mirage Men includes the suggestion that government agents likely "first identified" Bennewitz at this meeting or outright targeted him for his participation. At the meeting,   Bennewitz was introduced to highway patrol officer Gabe Valdez who was investigating the incidents.   

Bennewitz later listed July 1979 as the beginning of a "personally funded study" into UFOs.   Bennewitz reportedly began filming strange lights and recording unusual radio signals over Kirtland Air Force Base.

Meeting with 'Myrna Hansen'
On May 6, 1980,  State Police in Cimarron, New Mexico received a report from a woman calling herself "Myrna Hansen" (not to be confused with the movie star of the same name) describing a story involving interplanetary visitors, bright lights, and herds of cattle.   Police in Cimarron referred the case to their colleague in Dulce, Gabe Valdez, who they knew to be "the cattle mutiliation guy" for his interest in the cases.  Valdez, in turn, contacted Paul Bennewitz.

On May 7, Hansen and her son traveled to Albuquerque to meet with Bennewitz, staying in his home.  Hansen reported driving near Eagle Nest, New Mexico on May 5 when she and her son witnessed two huge, silent objects "big as two Goodyear blimps" hover over a meadow.  

APRO director James Lorenzen suggested contacting  Leo Sprinkle, a psychologist and tenured professor at the University of Wyoming who had been investigating "UFO contact" reports.  Bennewitz arranged for Sprinkle to fly to Albuquerque to hypnotize Hansen.  When Sprinkle arrived,  Hansen and Bennwitz insisted the sessions be conducted in Bennewitz's Lincoln Town Car, parked inside the family garage, with the car's windows covered with thick aluminum foil.    During her first regression, she reported a recollection of a cow being sucked into a hovering spaceship by a tractor beam.  

On May 11/12, 1980, under hypnosis, Hansen reported recollections of an abduction and of being taken to an underground base with "body parts floating in vats".  Hansen's recollections would later evolve into the legend of Dulce Base.  During the session, she exclaimed "Where's Roswell, New Mexico?", although most members of the public had not yet connected the town to UFO folklore.  Hansen reported recalling having been given an 'implant' by the aliens. 

On June 3, Sprinkle returned to visit Bennewitz, he found Bennewitz armed with pistol and rifle, concerned that "aliens could swarm over the walls at any minute".   Bennewitz expressed a desire to protect himself, his family, and Hansen.   

Bennewitz then turned to hypnotist James Harder, abduction researcher and a professor of Engineering;  Harder had conducted a hypnotic regression of Travis Walton in 1975.  The two believed Hansen was under the influence of alien beams and wrote detailed instructions on how to use aluminum foil to 'shield' a room from the beams before conducting a regression. 

Gabriel Valdez's son has argued "It is a possibility that the Myrna Hansen story was also part of the disinformation campaign... I will go out on a limb here and say that the story of Myrna Hansen was probably a well-orchestrated hoax because of a very important fact: the listening devices found in my dad’s house. The government heard all the conversations on the phone between my dad and [Bennewitz], so such a hoax would be relatively easy to accomplish... Myrna Hansen came into the picture in May of 1980 and the Air Force did not even acknowledge contact with Paul until November of 1980...  Although this evidence can barely be viewed as even circumstantial, it would explain a lot of things and how and why they transpired during the 1980s based on what we currently know."

Relationship with US government
On October 24, 1980,  Bennewitz contacted Kirtland Air Force base to report his findings. On November 10, 1980, Bennewitz briefed people at Kirtland.

"Dulce War"
In December 2, 1981 letter to U.S. Senator Pete Domenici, Benewitz explained that "sometime late 79 or first of 80 an argument insued [sic] over weapons and the military abandoned [Dulce base]; the final circumstance of the men unknown...".    Wrote Bennewitz:

To date, as noted, I have not heard from you and therefore will assume with all your new duties that you are very busy and just have not had the time. 
The facts I gave Captain Harris are simple and straightforward as follows:
1) I knew the location of the Alien bases in Northern New Mexico in the center of the Jicarilla Apache Reservation 4.5 miles northwest of Dulce, NM.
2) I know that someone in the military made a deal with the Aliens several years ago, giving the Indian land, cattle, etc. and apparent assurance of safety to the Alien in trade for Technology in the form of an Atomic powered ship at the same time establishing an extensive US base alongside to test the ship.
3) That sometime late 79 or first of 80 an argument insued [sic] over weapons and the military abandoned; the final circumstance of the men unknown.
4) That I had very high resolution official NASA U2 CIR (color infrared)photos in addition to low level and ground photos showing the base in total detail, (photos obtained legitimately through UNM) [University of New Mexico]
5) The ship design traded for is over thirty (30) years behind the alien technology.
6) I advised Captain Harris I knew of the two women and child near Austin, TX who were severely exposed to radiation at close distance from the ship in trouble and that it was seen to come west with helicopters (unmarked) and that the government was quietly paying their hospital expenses.
I am also very concerned that the President has not been totally advised of the situation and have forwarded a copy to him, cover letter enclosed for your record. It is hoped you will value this valuable input and in time get in touch with me.

In 1984, Bennewitz again referred to a 1979 conflict that led to the closure of the Alien-Human base.    The "Dulce War" would later be espoused by conspiracy theorists like John Lear, Bill Cooper, and Phil Schneider.

Increasing publicity
Bennewitz began contacting UFO researchers like Linda Moulton Howe and John Lear, as well as U.S. Senators Harrison Schmidt and Peter Domenici. 
By 1982, Bennewitz began to spread his ideas regarding Dulce Base to others in the ufology community. 

Bennewitz detailed his assertions to the Aerial Phenomena Research Organization, who regarded him as a deluded paranoid. 

On April 8, 1983,  Bennewitz was discussed in a UPI wire story about his supposed 1980 filming of UFOs over the Manzano Weapons Storage facility. He also reported being in communication with aliens via his computer. 

In 1984, Bennewitz's relationship with the government was detailed in UFO conspiracy book Clear Intent: the government coverup of the UFO experience 

The story spread rapidly within the UFO community and by 1987, UFOlogist John Lear claimed he had independent confirmations of the base's existence. 

In 1986, George Clinton Andrews discussed Dulce Base legends in his book Extra-Terrestrials Among Us. In 1988, the tabloid Weekly World News published a story entitled "UFO base found in New Mexico" which claimed that "diabolical invaders from another solar system have set up a secret underground base in the rugged mountains of northern New Mexico – so they can shanghai human guinea pigs for bizarre genetic experiments". The Weekly World News story used supposed quotes from UFOlogist Leonard Stringfield as a source for its claims. Upon learning of the story, Stringfield protested, "I never read such a distortion of facts in my life". 

In 1988, Paul Bennewitz wrote a paper titled "Project Beta" detailing how the base might be successfully attacked. 

 Beliefs
Bennewitz claimed the existence of a plot involving an extensive network of UFO bases tied to an alien colonization and control scheme to subjugate mankind. After he saw the hypnosis sessions of Myrna Hansen, who claimed to have UFO experiences, he became convinced that cattle mutilations were due to aliens. As a result, Bennewitz claimed to have uncovered evidence of aliens controlling humans through electromagnetic devices, and furthermore claimed that UFOs were regularly flying near Kirtland Air Force Base and the nearby Manzano Nuclear Weapons Storage Facility and Coyote Canyon Test Area.

Convinced that he was intercepting electronic communications originating from alien spacecraft located outside of Albuquerque, New Mexico, Bennewitz soon believed that he had located a secret alien facility that he called Dulce Base.

Hospitalization and disinformation revealed 

By August 1988, Bennewitz was accusing his wife of being in control of the extraterrestrials.  After attempting to barricade himself in his home using sandbags, his family admitted him to the mental health unit of Presbyterian Anna Kaseman Hospital;  He remained under observation there for one month. 

On July 1, 1989,  William Moore revealed that he tried to push Bennewitz  into a mental breakdown by feeding him false information about aliens.  

In 1990,  the Bennewitz story was featured in Howard Blum's book Out There: The Government's Secret Quest for Extraterrestrials.  Blum publicized that the government had sent undercover agents to befriend and mislead Bennewitz using counterfeit documents.

Death and legacy
In 1999, the Albuquerque Tribune anniversary page featured mention of Paul and Cindy's 50th anniversary. 

Paul Bennewitz died on June 23, 2003. He was buried at Santa Fe National Cemetery.

In 2005, the book "Project Beta: The Story of Paul Bennewitz, National Security, and the Creation of a Modern UFO Myth" by Greg Bishop further publicized the events. 
Mark Pilkington's book about the project, also called Mirage Men, was published in 2010 by Constable & Robinson.  The book was adapted into the 2013 documentary "Mirage Men".  Former special agent for the U.S. Air Force Office of Special Investigations Richard Doty claimed that in the 1980s he was tasked with hoaxing documents and feeding false information to UFO researchers, including Bennewitz.

References

Further reading
 Greg Bishop, Project Beta: The Story of Paul Bennewitz, National Security, and the Creation of a Modern UFO Myth, Paraview Pocket Books, 2005; 
 Jerome Clark, The UFO Encyclopedia, Volume 3: High Strangeness, UFO’s from 1960 through 1979; Omnigraphics, 1996; 
 Jerome Clark, The UFO Book: Encyclopedia of the Extraterrestrial, Visible Ink, 1998,

External links
 
 Brad Smith on Paul Bennewitz and Dulce
 The Paul Bennewitz Case Revisited
 An Independent Report by Dr Michael E. Salla (2003)

1927 births
2003 deaths
Burials at Santa Fe National Cemetery
UFO conspiracy theorists
Ufologists
American conspiracy theorists